British prime minister Rishi Sunak carried out the first cabinet reshuffle of his premiership on 7 February 2023. The reshuffle saw a significant restructuring of a number of government departments, and gave Sunak the opportunity to fill the vacancy left by Nadhim Zahawi after he was dismissed as Chairman of the Conservative Party and Minister without Portfolio on 29 January 2023.

The reshuffle saw a significant restructuring of government departments. The Department for International Trade and the Department for Business, Energy and Industrial Strategy (BEIS) were merged to form the new Department for Business and Trade. The energy and climate policy responsibilities of BEIS were spun off to form the new Department for Energy Security and Net Zero. The science and innovation policies of BEIS were combined with the digital portfolio of the former Department for Digital, Culture, Media and Sport (DCMS) to form the new Department for Science, Innovation and Technology. The DCMS continues as the newly constituted Department for Culture, Media and Sport.

Cabinet-level changes

Junior ministerial changes

Whips' Office appointments

Conservative Party appointments

See also 
Sunak ministry
Premiership of Rishi Sunak
2023 in politics and government

Notes

References

External Links 
Making Government Deliver: Updating the machinery of government for the world of today and of tomorrow policy paper forwarded by Rishi Sunak outlining the restructuring of the UK Government in February 2023.

Cabinet reshuffles in the United Kingdom
Rishi Sunak
February 2023 events in the United Kingdom
2023 in British politics